City of Bristol Rowing Club is a rowing club on the Bristol Harbour next to River Avon, based at The Boathouse, Albion Dockside Estate, Hanover Place, Bristol.

History
The club has facilities for all age groups  and produced a national champion crew in 2015 when the under-14 quadruple coxed sculls won the national title.

National champions

References

Sport in Bristol
Rowing clubs in England
Rowing clubs of the River Avon